Nonlocality may refer to:
 Action at a distance, the concept in physics of nonlocal interactions
 Principle of locality, the opposite of action at a distance
 Quantum nonlocality, nonlocal phenomena in quantum mechanics
 Nonlocal Lagrangian, a type of Lagrangian (a mathematical function)

See also
 Locality (disambiguation)
 Nonlocal (disambiguation)

ru:Нелокальность